Marek Igaz (13 September 1986 in Trenčín) is a Slovak footballer who currently plays for GKS Tychy.

Career
The goalkeeper began his career with FK ZTS Dubnica and joined 2004 to Czech club FC Elseremo Brumov. After two years with Brumov returned in summer 2006 to his youthclub FK ZTS Dubnica.

Personal life
Igaz was born in Trenčín and grown up in Bánovce nad Bebravou.

Notes

1986 births
Living people
Slovak footballers
FK Dubnica players
MŠK Púchov players
GKS Tychy players
Slovak Super Liga players
Association football goalkeepers
Slovak expatriate sportspeople in the Czech Republic
Slovak expatriate footballers
Slovak expatriate sportspeople in Poland
Expatriate footballers in Poland
Expatriate footballers in the Czech Republic
FK Iskra Borčice players
Sportspeople from Trenčín